Ingvar Eggert Sigurðsson (born 22 November 1963) is an Icelandic actor who has worked extensively in Icelandic cinema. He has had roles in Friðrik Þór Friðriksson's Englar alheimsins (Angels of the Universe) and Baltasar Kormákur's Mýrin (Jar City) and Everest. In addition to his film work, Ingvar has also acted extensively in television and stage productions, both in Iceland and overseas.

Ingvar has won the Edda Award for Actor or Actress of the Year four times for his performances in Slurpinn & Co. Englar alheimsins (Angels of the Universe), Kaldaljós (Cold Light), and Mýrin (Jar City) in 1998, 2000, 2004 and 2006 respectively, as well as winning the Audience Award at the 2000 European Film Awards for his performance in Englar alheimsins (Angels of the Universe). Apart from that he has been nominated many times for several roles in various films.

Ingvar has become internationally known for his role as police officer Ásgeir in the Icelandic TV series Trapped (2015–18).

In May 2019, Ingvar was awarded the Critics' Week festival best actor award for his performance in A White, White Day.

Partial filmography

 Ingaló (1992) – Skúli
 Skýjahöllin (1994) – Pabbi Alla
 Devil's Island (1996) – Grjóni
 Pearls and Swine (1997) – Viktor
 Count Me Out (1997) – Hilmar
 No Trace (1998) – Óli
 Slurpinn & Co. (1998, short)
 Angels of the Universe (2000) – Páll
 Dramarama (2001) – Sölvi
 No Such Thing (2001) – Dr. Svendsen
 Falcons (2002) – Cop
 K-19: The Widowmaker (2002) – Chief Engineer Gorelov
 Stormy Weather (2003) – Gunnar
 Cold Light (2004) – Older Grímur
 Beowulf & Grendel (2005) – Grendel
 Jar City (2006) – Erlendur
 Children (2006)
 Parents (2007) – Óskar Sveinn
 Great Plane (2007)
 Stóra planið (2008) – Magnús
 Skrapp út (2008) – Siggi
 Country Wedding (2008) – Brynjólfur
 Reykjavík-Rotterdam (2008) – Steingrímur
 8 (2008) – Father (segment "The Letter")
 King's Road (2010) – BB
 Woyzeck (2010) – Woyzeck
 Undercurrent (2010) – Skipper Anton
 Courier (2010) – Captain Slavko
 Polite People (2011) – Þorsteinn
 Borgríki (2011) – Gunnar
 I Against I (2012) – Issac Revchenko
 Rock Bottom (2013)
 Of Horses and Men (2013) – Kolbeinn
 Metalhead (2013) – Karl, Hera's father
 Playtime (2013) – The Artist
 Harry & Heimir: Morð eru til alls fyrst (2014) – Símon
 One Night in Istanbul (2014) – Altan
 Borgríki 2 (2014) – Gunnar
 Dirk Ohm – Illusjonisten som forsvant (2015) – Lensmann
 Everest (2015) – Anatoli Boukreev
 Sparrows (2015) – Gunnar
 Trapped (Icelandic TV series) (2015-2018)
 Fyrir framan annað fólk (2016) – Doctor
 The Aquatic Effect (2016) – Siggi
 The Oath (2016) – Halldór
 Svanurinn (2017) – Karl
 Justice League (2017) – Mayor
 Vargur (2018)
 Mihkel (2018)
 Fantastic Beasts: The Crimes of Grindelwald (2018) – Grimmson
 A White, White Day (2019) – Ingimundur
 Lamb (2021) - Man on Television
 Katla (2021)
 Zack Snyder's Justice League (2021) - Mayor
 The Northman (2022)
 Godland (2022) - Ragnar

References

External links

Living people
1963 births
Ingvar Eggert Sigurdsson
Ingvar Eggert Sigurdsson
Ingvar Eggert Sigurdsson
Ingvar Eggert Sigurdsson
Ingvar Eggert Sigurdsson
Ingvar Eggert Sigurdsson